Sigrid Ekendahl (1904-1996) was a Swedish politician of the Social Democratic Party. She was a trade union official and only female board member of the Swedish Trade Union Confederation. She was MP of the Second Chamber of the Parliament of Sweden from 1940 to 1948 and 1956 to 1968.

References

External links

1904 births
1996 deaths
20th-century Swedish women politicians
20th-century Swedish politicians
Members of the Riksdag from the Social Democrats
Women members of the Riksdag
Swedish trade unionists